Kinda Mazen Alloush (born on 27 March 1982 in Hama) is a Syrian actress known for her roles in Syrian and Egyptian drama and cinema.

Early life and career 
Alloush was born in Hama, Syria to a father who was a physician and mother who was an engineer. She studied French literature then she theater criticism at Higher Institute for Dramatic Arts in Damascus. Alloush worked as an author and assistant director. Her first role was in Ashwak Naiema series with Rasha Shurbatji in 2004. Alloush has also acted in many Egyptian drama series such as Dalaa Albanat in 2014, as well as in Egyptian films such as 33 days (2013), Excuse My French (2014), and Hepta (2016).

Personal life 
In 2008, Alloush married Syrian scriptwriter Fares Al-Thahabi. The couple divorced in April 2016. That same year in November, she married Egyptian actor Amr Youssef. The couple celebrated their wedding in January 2017. She gave birth to her first daughter Hayat in November 2018.

Alloush is known for supporting the Syrian Revolution since 2011. She signed on what was known by "Milk Statement" in April 2011, the statement demanded the delivery of humanitarian aid including food, medicine and milk to the children of Daraa, which was besieged by government forces. She criticized First Lady of Syria Asma al-Assad for not standing with mothers of victims of Syrian regime.

She has resided in Egypt since 2011.

Works

Series 
 Sleep thorns (2005)
 Nazar Qabani (2005)
 Baibars (2005)
 Woman Shadow (2005)
 Hasiba (2006)
 Sultana (2007)
 Another Dawn (2007)
 The Invasion (2007)
 Like that we married (2008)
 Another raining day (2008)
 Light spot (2008)
 Soft Silleness (2009)
 The struggle of money (2009)
 Wanted men (2010)
 People of Cairo (2011)
 Forbidden Love (2011)
 Birth from side (2011)
 In The palm of demon (2012)
 The Naughty (2012)
 Daughters of Family (2012)
 The Bats (2013)
 Friendly fires (2013)
 Sanaoud Baad Kalil (2013)
 The seven commandments (2014)
 Countdown (2014)
 Readness of Girls (2014)
 Steva (2015)
 Teen Wolf (2015)
 Joys of the Dome (2016)
 Stone of Hell (2017)
 Tom and Sherry (2017)
 People of love 3 (2017)

Films 
 Passion (2007)
 Escaping Tel Aviv (2009)
 A whole one (2011)
 El-Fagommi (2011)
 Bartita (2012)
 The Benefit (2012)
 33 days (2012)
 Excuse My French (2014)
 At Cairo time (2015)
 Hepta (2016)
 The Originals (2017)
 The Swimmers (2022)
 Nezouh (2022)

References

External links 
 

1982 births
Living people
People from Hama
Syrian film actresses
Syrian television actresses
21st-century Syrian actresses
Syrian film directors
Syrian women film directors
Syrian dissidents
Syrian Muslims
Syrian emigrants to Egypt